New Westminster was a federal electoral district in the province of British Columbia, Canada, that was represented in the House of Commons of Canada from 1871 to 1979.

This riding was created in 1871 as New Westminster District when British Columbia joined Confederation and filled by special byelection.  It was renamed "New Westminster" in 1872. The riding was abolished in 1976, when it was redistributed into the ridings of New Westminster—Coquitlam and Burnaby.

History of boundaries 

Originally, this riding covered  the entirety of the Lower Mainland, there being no other riding in the area (Vancouver riding was Vancouver Island, not the present city of Vancouver).  Once the City of Vancouver and its suburbs the municipalities of Point Grey and South Vancouver were chartered, those areas were excluded from the New Westminster riding (1903) but the riding continued to include Richmond, Delta and all the Fraser Valley communities up the river to one mile beyond Yale.  In 1914, the riding consisted of New Westminster, Richmond and Delta - the Surrey-Langley area had become part of the Fraser Valley riding.  In a further redistribution in 1924, the riding was shrunk to all areas south of the Fraser River west of and including the Township of Langley, plus the city of New Westminster and the City of Burnaby.  As population in the Lower Mainland continued to grow, the 1933 redistribution transferred northern Burnaby to Vancouver North. In 1947, the rest of Burnaby and Richmond were removed and became Burnaby-Richmond, and New Westminster riding consisted of New Westminster, Surrey, Delta and Langley.

The 1966 redistribution, which combined northern Burnaby into North Vancouver-Seymour, New Westminster riding extended as far into Burnaby as Grandview Highway and Edmonds Avenue, including Burnaby Mountain and the areas of Coquitlam west of Laurentian Avenue.  At the time this included the then-municipality of Fraser Mills adjoining the francophone community at Maillardville.  Langley, Surrey and Delta were excluded from the riding.

The riding was abolished in 1976.  Successor ridings were Burnaby and New Westminster—Coquitlam.

Members of Parliament

Electoral history

See also 

 List of Canadian federal electoral districts
 Past Canadian electoral districts

External links 
Riding history from the Library of Parliament
 Expenditures - 2004
 Expenditures - 2000
 Expenditures – 1997
 Website of the Parliament of Canada

References

Former federal electoral districts of British Columbia